Warren Håkon Christofer Kamanzi (born 11 November 2000) is a Norwegian professional footballer who plays as a right-back for  club Toulouse.

Club career
Kamanzi came to Rosenborg's academy from Strindheim in 2015. In 2020 he signed a contract to become a part of the first team squad. In 2021, he was loaned out to Ranheim in the Norwegian First Division for the entire season. At the start of 2022, Kamanzi signed for Tromsø.

On 2 January 2023, Kamanzi signed for Ligue 1 club Toulouse in a transfer worth €600,000. He signed a contract until 2026.

International career
In the autumn of 2022, Kamanzi was called up to Rwanda's national team. For the time being, Kamanzi declined the call-up, hoping to be called up to the Norwegian under-21 team some time before the 2023 UEFA European Under-21 Championship. His first under-21 callup came on 18 September 2022.

Career statistics

References

External links
 

2000 births
Living people
Norwegian people of Rwandan descent
Norwegian footballers
Norway under-21 international footballers
Association football defenders
Rosenborg BK players
Ranheim Fotball players
Tromsø IL players
Toulouse FC players
Norwegian First Division players
Eliteserien players
Ligue 1 players
Norwegian expatriate footballers
Expatriate footballers in France
Norwegian expatriate sportspeople in France